The Stikine people (Shtaxʼhéen Ḵwáan) are a ḵwáan or regional group of the Tlingit, today based at Wrangell, Alaska. Their historical territory included Wrangell Island and other islands of the Alexander Archipelago, as well as the basin of the lower Stikine River.

References

See also
Taku River Tlingit
Chief Shakes

 

Tlingit